Great Britain Boxing is a team of elite amateur boxers from Great Britain, which is funded by the National Lottery and is based in the English Institute of Sport in Sheffield.

The Great British boxing team is split into two squads, the 'Podium' and 'Development', and the concept is that those of the 'Podium' are largely the current Olympians, the more experienced and accomplished of the elite of amateur boxing in Britain. Whereas the Development Squad focuses on developing the future generation of boxers for the 2020 Tokyo Olympics and beyond. The British Boxing team has emerged as a 'force' in the amateur boxing game in recent years. The sophisticated set-up at the 'amateur' base is supported by a team of world-class nutritionalists, physiotherapists, psychologists as well as a partnership with Soulmate Food.

In 2009 Natasha Jonas became the first female boxer to compete for GB Boxing.

Training base 
The GB Boxing Team are based at the English Institute of Sport in Sheffield where they have a state-of-the-art purpose-built boxing gymnasium, opened in 2009.

Olympic Games

1948 London Olympics 
Date: 1948

Location:   London, England

Participants: 8

Medal Haul: 0 G, 2 S, 0 B

Boxers:

Coaches:

1952 Helsinki Olympics 
Date: 1952

Location:  Helsinki, Finland

Participants: 10

Medal Haul: 0 G, 0 S, 0 B

Boxers:

Coaches:

1956 Melbourne Olympics 
Date: 1956

Location:  Melbourne, Australia

Participants: 7

Medal Haul: 2 G, 1 S, 2 B

Boxers:

Coaches:

1960 Rome Olympics 
Date: 1960

Location:  Rome, Italy

Participants: 5

Medal Haul: 0 G, 0 S, 3 B

Boxers:

Coaches:

1964 Tokyo Olympics 
Date: 1964

Location:  Tokyo, Japan

Participants:  8

Medal Haul: 0 G, 0 S, 0 B

Boxers:

Coaches:

1968 Mexico City Olympics 
Date: 1968

Location:  Mexico City, Mexico

Participants: 2

Medal Haul: 1 G, 0 S, 0 B

Boxers:

Coaches:

1972 Munich Olympics 
Date: 1972

Location:  Munich, West Germany

Participants: 8

Medal Haul: 0 G, 0 S, 3 B

'Boxers:

Coaches:

1976 Montreal Olympics 
Date: 1976

Location:  Montreal, Canada

Participants: 6

Medal Haul: 0 G, 0 S, 1 B

Boxers:

Coaches:

1980 Moscow Olympics 
Date: 1980

Location:  Moscow, Russia

Participants: 9

Medal Haul: 0 G, 0 S, 1 B

Boxers:

Coaches:

1984 Los Angeles Olympics 
Date: 1984

Location:  Los Angeles, United States

Participants: 11

Medal Haul: 0 G, 0 S, 1 B

Boxers:

1988 Seoul Olympics 
Date: 1988

Location:  Seoul, South Korea

Participants: 8

Medal Haul: 0 G, 0 S, 1 B

Boxers:

Coaches:

1992 Barcelona Olympics 
Date: 1992

Location:  Barcelona, Spain

Participants: 7

Medal Haul: 0 G, 0 S, 1 B

Boxers:

1996 Atlanta Olympics 
Date: 1996

Location:  Atlanta, United States

Participants: 2

Medal Haul: 0 G, 0 S, 0 B

Boxers:

Coaches:

2000 Sydney Olympics 
Date: 2000

Location:  Sydney, Australia

Participants: 2

Medal Haul: 1 G, 0 S, 0 B

Boxers:

Coaches:
  Ian Irwin
  Kelvyn Travis

2004 Athens Olympics 
Date: 2004

Location:  Athens, Greece

Participants: 1

Medal Haul: 0 G, 1 S, 0 B

Boxers:

Coaches:
  Terry Edwards

2008 Beijing Olympics 
Date: 2008

Location:  Beijing, China

Participants: 8

Medal Haul: 1 G, 0 S, 2 B

Boxers:

Coaches:
  Nigel Davies
  Terry Edwards
  Dave Pocknall

2012 London Olympics 

Date: 2012

Location:  London, England

Participants: 10

Medal Haul: 3 G, 1 S, 1 B

Boxers:

Coaches:
  Dave Alloway
  Lee Pullen
  Paul Walmsley

2016 Rio Olympics 

Date: 2016

Location:  Rio de Janeiro, Brazil

Participants: 9

Medal Haul:

Boxers:

Coaches:
  Dave Alloway
  Lee Pullen
  Paul Walmsley

World Championships

1974 World Amateur Boxing Championships 
Date: 1974

Location:  Havana, Cuba

Participants:

Medal Haul: 0 G, 0 S, 0 B

Boxers:

Coaches: 1978 World Amateur Boxing Championships 
Date: 1978

Location:  Belgrade, Yugoslavia

Participants:

Medal Haul: 0 G, 0 S, 0 B

Boxers:

Coaches: 1982 World Amateur Boxing Championships 
Date: 1982

Location:  Munich, West Germany

Participants:

Medal Haul: 0 G, 0 S, 0 B

Boxers:

Coaches: 1986 World Amateur Boxing Championships 
Date: 1986

Location:  Reno, United States

Participants:

Medal Haul: 0 G, 0 S, 0 B

Boxers:

Coaches: 1989 World Amateur Boxing Championships 
Date: 1989

Location:  Moscow, Soviet Union

Participants:

Medal Haul: 0 G, 0 S, 0 B

Boxers:

Coaches: 1991 World Amateur Boxing Championships 
Date: 1991

Location:  Sydney, Australia

Participants:

Medal Haul: 0 G, 0 S, 0 B

Boxers:

'''Coaches:

 1993 World Amateur Boxing Championships Date: 1993Location:  Tampere, FinlandParticipants:Medal Haul: 0 G, 0 S, 0 BBoxers:Coaches:

 1995 World Amateur Boxing Championships Date: 1995Location:  Berlin, GermanyParticipants:Medal Haul: 0 G, 0 S, 0 BBoxers:Coaches:

 1997 World Amateur Boxing Championships Date: 1997Location:  Budapest, HungaryParticipants:Medal Haul: 0 G, 0 S, 0 BBoxers:Coaches:

 1999 World Amateur Boxing Championships Date: 1999Location:  Houston, United StatesParticipants:Medal Haul: 0 G, 0 S, 1 BBoxers:Coaches:

 2001 World Amateur Boxing Championships Date: 2001Location:  Belfast, Northern IrelandParticipants:Medal Haul: 0 G, 1 S, 1 BBoxers:Coaches: 2003 World Amateur Boxing Championships Date: 2003Location:  Bangkok, ThailandParticipants:Medal Haul: 0 G, 0 S, 0 BBoxers:Coaches: 2005 World Amateur Boxing Championships Date: 2005Location:  Mianyang, ChinaParticipants:Medal Haul: 0 G, 0 S, 1 BBoxers:Coaches: 2007 World Amateur Boxing Championships Date: 2007Location:  Chicago, United StatesParticipants:Medal Haul: 1 G, 0 S, 2 BBoxers:Coaches: 2009 World Amateur Boxing Championships Date: 2009Location:  Milan, ItalyParticipants:Medal Haul: 0 G, 0 S, 0 BBoxers:Coaches: 2011 World Amateur Boxing Championships  Date: 2011Location:  Baku, AzerbaijanParticipants: 13Medal Haul: 0 G,  3 S, 1 BBoxers:Coaches: 2013 World Amateur Boxing Championships Date: 2013Location:  Almaty, KazakhstanParticipants: 13Medal Haul:Boxers:Coaches: European Championships 
 2011 European Amateur Boxing Championships Date: 2011Location:  Ankara, TurkeyParticipants:Medal Haul:Boxers:Coaches: British Lionhearts 

The British Lionhearts represent Great Britain in the World Series of Boxing.
Founded in 2012, the Lionhearts competed in the 2012–13 season of WSB, reaching the quarter-finals where they were defeated by Mexico Guerreros. However, they didn't enter in the following season.

Current squadMen:49 kg  Galal Yafai

52 kg  Will Cawley

52 kg  Kiaran MacDonald

56 kg  Niall Farrell

56 kg  Peter McGrail

60 kg  Calum French

64 kg  Luke McCormack

64 kg  Mickey McDonagh

69 kg  Pat McCormack

69 kg  Cyrus Pattinson

69 kg  Harris Akbar

75 kg  Mark Dickinson

81 kg  Sammy Lee

91 kg  Cheavon Clarke

91 kg  Lewis Williams

91 kg  Scott Forrest

91+kg  Solomon Dacres

91+kg  Frazer ClarkeWomen:'''

52 kg  Ebonie Jones

60 kg  Paige Murney

60 kg  Sandy Ryan

64 kg  Rosie Eccles

75 kg  Natasha Gale

75 kg  Lauren Price

References

Boxing in the United Kingdom
Sports organisations of the United Kingdom